Chionodes ludio is a moth in the family Gelechiidae. It is found in North America, where it has been recorded from New Jersey.

The larvae feed on Quercus ilicifolia.

References

Chionodes
Moths described in 1999
Moths of North America